My Bluegrass Heart is a studio album by American banjo player Béla Fleck, the third of a trilogy that includes the 1988 album Drive and the 1999 album The Bluegrass Sessions: Tales from the Acoustic Planet, Vol. 2. My Bluegrass Heart features guest appearances from Sam Bush, Jerry Douglas, Stuart Duncan, Edgar Meyer, Bryan Sutton, Billy Strings, Chris Thile, Noam Pikelny, Sierra Hull, Molly Tuttle, Tony Trischka, Michael Cleveland and David Grisman.

The first single, "Charm School" featuring Billy Strings and Chris Thile, was released on July 28, 2021.  The second single, "Vertigo" featuring Sam Bush, Stuart Duncan, Edgar Meyer, and Bryan Sutton, was released on August 13.

The album won the Grammy Award for Best Bluegrass Album at the 2021 Grammy Awards.

Track listing

Vertigo (feat. Sam Bush, Stuart Duncan, Edgar Meyer, and Bryan Sutton)
The Old North Woods
Slippery Eel (feat. Billy Strings and Chris Thile)
Hug Point (feat. Sierra Hull and Molly Tuttle)
Boulderdash (feat. Tony Trischka and Noam Pikelny)
Our Little Secret
Round Rock (feat. Michael Cleveland and Jerry Douglas)
Baptist Pumpkin Farm
Charm School (feat. Billy Strings and Chris Thile)
Strider (feat. Sierra Hull and Molly Tuttle)
This Old Road (feat. David Grisman and Billy Strings)
Us Chickens
Sour Grapes
Hunky Dory
Tentacle Dragon (Revenge of the) [feat. Billy Strings]
Bum's Rush (feat. Sam Bush, Jerry Douglas, Stuart Duncan, Edgar Meyer, and Bryan Sutton)
Hunter's Moon
Wheels Up (feat. Sierra Hull and Molly Tuttle) 
Psalm 136 (feat. Chris Thile)

References

2021 albums
Béla Fleck albums
Bluegrass albums
Grammy Award for Best Bluegrass Album